Alessandro Ghinami (19 May 1923 – 8 January 2016) was an Italian civil servant and politician from Sardinia. He served as the President of Sardinia from 1979 to 1980.

Biography
Ghinami was the prominent politician of the Social Democrats; he was President of the Regional Council, President of the Region of Sardinia for a year and a deputy in the X and XI legislature. He has held positions on numerous committees and was under secretary in the governments Goria, De Mita, Andreotti VI, and VII.

References

1923 births
2016 deaths
People from Oristano
Italian Democratic Socialist Party politicians
Deputies of Legislature IX of Italy
Deputies of Legislature X of Italy
Presidents of Sardinia
Members of the Regional Council of Sardinia